Kenneth Cooper Alexander (born October 17, 1966) is an American politician currently serving as mayor of Norfolk, Virginia.

Alexander also serves as chancellor for twenty career colleges which includes: (i) Centura College; a healthcare, business, and skilled trade programs school with four campuses in Hampton Roads and one in Richmond, Virginia; (ii) Aviation Institute of Maintenance (AIM), founded in Norfolk and now operating fourteen campuses nationwide and growing to become the largest system of aviation maintenance schools in the country; (iii) Tidewater Tech, a trade school located in Norfolk which offers welding and automotive mechanics programs and is currently the largest supplier of certified welders and HVAC technicians in the Commonwealth.  The growth and work of this trade schools college system led to the establishment of the only Wind Turbine Technician program in the Mid-Atlantic, currently being offered at the Centura Norfolk Campus.

Alexander also serves as president of Metropolitan Funeral Services.

A native of Norfolk, he served in the Virginia House of Delegates from 2002 to 2012, representing the 89th District in Norfolk.  He served in the Senate of Virginia from 2012 to 2016, representing the 5th District in Norfolk and Chesapeake.

Alexander has been a guest columnist in Virginia newspapers, lecturer on political science and leadership studies, and he is the author of Persistence: Evelyn Butts and the African American Quest for Full Citizenship and Self-Determination (2021).

Early life and education
Born in 1966, Alexander grew up in the neighborhoods of Berkley and South Norfolk, at the crossroads of the cities of Norfolk and Chesapeake. He attended Lake Taylor High School where he was drum major of the marching band and served as parliamentarian of the student body, graduating in 1985.

Alexander next earned an associate's degree in Mortuary Science from Brightpoint Community College, formerly John Tyler Community College, and a bachelor’s degree in Political Science from Old Dominion University. He later served as a political science instructor at Tidewater Community College after completing a master’s degree in Diplomacy from Norwich University. In 2019, Alexander earned a PhD in Leadership and Change from Antioch University.

Alexander has served as President of the Beacon Light Civic League, vice-chair of Norfolk's Planning Commission, and member of Norfolk's Human Service Commission and Economic Development Authority.  He helped found the Norfolk Chesapeake Portsmouth Community Development Federal Credit Union, a financial institution that provides access to low-cost financial services.  Alexander was instrumental in developing new single-family homes in Berkley and a shopping center that attracted a major supermarket chain.

Electoral history

General Assembly career
In May 2002, Governor Mark Warner appointed the 89th District incumbent, Delegate Jerrauld Jones, to be Director of the Virginia Department of Juvenile Justice. Alexander won the Democratic nomination, and won the special election on August 6 with 72% of the vote in a three-way race.

Alexander was unopposed in two of his three succeeding elections.

On December 15, 2008, Alexander was chosen as chair of the Virginia Legislative Black Caucus.

In a special election on September 4, 2012, Alexander was elected to the Virginia Senate representing the 5th Senate District; he succeeded Senator Yvonne Miller, who died in office.

Mayoralty
On May 3, 2016 he was elected mayor of Norfolk, Virginia with 51.6% of the vote in a three-way race. He is the city's first black mayor.

References

Sources
Virginia House of Delegates: Bio for Kenneth C. Alexander (2008 session)

External links
Official website
Virginia Public Access Project: Kenneth Alexander
Virginia State Board of Elections results for 89th House District
November 6, 2007 General Election
November 8, 2005 General Election
November 4, 2003 General Election
August 6, 2002 Special Election
Project Vote Smart - Representative Kenneth Cooper 'Kenny' Alexander (VA) profile
Follow the Money - Kenneth Cooper Alexander
2005 2003 campaign contributions

1966 births
Living people
Democratic Party members of the Virginia House of Delegates
Democratic Party Virginia state senators
Old Dominion University alumni
Norwich University alumni
Mayors of Norfolk, Virginia
African-American mayors in Virginia
African-American state legislators in Virginia
21st-century American politicians
21st-century African-American politicians
20th-century African-American people